Hypostomus boulengeri is a species of catfish in the family Loricariidae. It is native to South America. The species reaches 24.5 cm (9.6 inches) SL and is believed to be a facultative air-breather.

H. boulengeri was originally described in 1903 from the Paraguay River basin in Paraguay and Brazil. In 2005, its presence in the Paraná River basin in Argentina was confirmed. In 2016, it was found to occur in the Bermejo River basin as well.

References 

Fish described in 1903
Hypostominae